Utility Trailer may refer to:

 Trailer (vehicle), an unpowered vehicle pulled by a powered vehicle
 Utility Trailer Manufacturing Company, an American semi-trailer manufacturer